Alamogordo High School is a public high school in Alamogordo, New Mexico. It is a part of Alamogordo Public Schools.

History
Alamogordo High was established in 1919 in a 13–classroom facility made of brick, which had two floors.

In 1949 the high school admitted its first student with African descent, who was mixed African/German American, just to play sports, although he had to take classes at the all-black Delaware School for Negro Children. When the personnel at Holloman Air Force Base asked for the school district to completely desegregate for the benefit of its black employees, the school system did so. In 1968 the current high school facility, which had Phase I constructed, opened while the junior high school moved into the former high school building. In 1969 Alamogordo Mid High School opened, so only grades 11-12 were at Almogordo High while grades 9-10 went to the new school.

In 1968 there was a student strike at Alamogordo High School, headed by 12 and involving about 300, which demanded improved conditions for teachers and students.

Attendance area
In addition to Alamogordo it serves Boles Acres, High Rolls, Holloman Air Force Base, La Luz, and Orogrande.

References

External links
 
 

Alamogordo, New Mexico
1919 establishments in New Mexico
Educational institutions established in 1919
Public high schools in New Mexico